Neamh Woods is a Northern Ireland netball international and a Tyrone Ladies' Gaelic footballer. She was a member of the Northern Ireland teams at the 2018 Commonwealth Games and the 2019 Netball World Cup. As a Ladies' Gaelic footballer she played for Tyrone in the 2010 All-Ireland final. She captained Tyrone when they won the 2018 All-Ireland Intermediate Ladies' Football Championship. She was an All Star in 2008 and 2018 and was the 2018 TG4 Intermediate Player's Player of the Year.

Early life, family and education
Woods is from Clanabogan, County Tyrone. Her father, Seamus Woods, played Gaelic football as a midfielder for Tyrone during the 1970s. Together with his brothers, Canice and Laurence, he also helped Carrickmore win the Tyrone Senior Football Championship in 1977, 1978 and 1979. More recently he has managed ladies' Gaelic football teams at Drumragh Sarsfields. 
Neamh began playing netball while attending Sacred Heart College, Omagh. She subsequently attended University of Ulster, Jordanstown and Queen's University, where she studied physical education.

Netball

Clubs
Woods plays netball for the Lisburn–based Larkfield club in the Northern Ireland Premier League. Her teammates at Larkfield include fellow Northern Ireland international, Caroline O'Hanlon and Michelle Drayne.

Northern Ireland
Woods has represented Northern Ireland at under-17, under-19, under-21, university and senior levels. She was a member of the Northern Ireland team that won 2015 Nations Cup. She also helped Northern Ireland win the silver medal at the 2017 European Netball Championship. She was subsequently a member of the Northern Ireland teams at the 2018 Commonwealth Games and at the 2019 Netball World Cup. Woods is one of several Ladies' Gaelic footballers to play netball for Northern Ireland. Others include Caroline O'Hanlon (Armagh), Laura Mason (Down) and Michelle Drayne, Emma and Michelle Magee (all Antrim).

Gaelic football

Clubs
Woods plays Ladies' Gaelic football at club level for Drumragh Sarsfields. Before 2003 the club did not have girls or ladies teams so Woods played with boys teams up to under-14 level. At an All-Ireland Feile when Drumragh played Glenswilly she marked Michael Murphy. In 2008 she was a member of the University of Ulster, Jordanstown team that won the O'Connor Cup. She  also played for UUJ in the 2010, 2011 and 2012 O'Connor Cup finals  and for Queen's University in the 2014 final.

Inter-county
Woods played for Tyrone in the 2010 All-Ireland Senior Ladies' Football Championship Final against Dublin. In 2018 she captained Tyrone when they won the All-Ireland Intermediate Ladies' Football Championship. In the final she scored two goals as Tyrone defeated Meath 6–8 to 1–14. Woods was also named player of the match. In 2008 and 2018 Woods was selected as an All Star. In 2018 she was named the TG4 Intermediate Player's Player of the Year.

Personal life
Woods is a PE teacher. She has worked at Sacred Heart College, Omagh and St Ciaran's College, Ballygawley.

Honours

Netball
Northern Ireland
Nations Cup
Winners: 2015 
European Netball Championship
Runners Up: 2017

Gaelic football
Tyrone
All-Ireland Senior Ladies' Football Championship
Runners Up: 2010 
All-Ireland Intermediate Ladies' Football Championship 
Winners: 2018
Runners Up: 2017
University of Ulster, Jordanstown
O'Connor Cup
Winners: 2008 
Runner up: 2010, 2011, 2012 
Queen's University
O'Connor Cup 
Runner up: 2014
Individual
All Stars
 2008, 2018
TG4 Intermediate Player's Player of the Year
 2018

References

1989 births
Living people
Tyrone ladies' Gaelic footballers
Queen's University Belfast Gaelic footballers
Northern Ireland netball internationals
Netball players at the 2018 Commonwealth Games
Commonwealth Games competitors for Northern Ireland
2019 Netball World Cup players
Alumni of Ulster University
Alumni of Queen's University Belfast
Schoolteachers from Northern Ireland